Martin Ketteridge (born 2 October 1964) is a former professional rugby league footballer who played in the 1980s and 1990s.

Playing career

International honours
Martin Ketteridge won 3 caps (plus 1 as a substitute) for Scotland in 1996 while at Halifax.

Challenge Cup Final appearances
Martin Ketteridge played right- and scored a goal in Castleford's 15-14 victory over Hull Kingston Rovers in the 1986 Challenge Cup Final during the 1985–86 season at Wembley Stadium, London on Saturday 3 May 1986, and played right-, and scored 2-goals in the 12-28 defeat by Wigan in the 1992 Challenge Cup Final during the 1991–92 season at Wembley Stadium, London on Saturday 2 May 1992, in front of a crowd of 77,386.

County Cup Final appearances
Martin Ketteridge played left- in Castleford's 18-22 defeat by Hull Kingston Rovers in the 1985 Yorkshire Cup Final during the 1985–86 season at Headingley, Leeds on Sunday 27 October 1985, played left-, scored a try, and 5-goals in the 31-24 victory over Hull F.C. in the 1986 Yorkshire Cup Final during the 1986–87 season at Headingley, Leeds on Saturday 11 October 1986, played left-, and scored a 2-goals in the 12-12 draw with Bradford Northern in the 1987 Yorkshire Cup Final during the 1987–88 season at Headingley, Leeds on Saturday 17 October 1987, played left-, and scored a goal in the 2-11 defeat by Bradford Northern in the 1987 Yorkshire Cup Final replay during the 1987–88 season at Elland Road, Leeds on Saturday 31 October 1987, played as an interchange/substitute, i.e number 15, (replacing  Neil Battye) in the 12-33 defeat by Leeds in the 1988 Yorkshire Cup Final during the 1988–89 season at Elland Road, Leeds on Sunday 16 October 1988, and played  and scored a try in the 11-8 victory over Wakefield Trinity in the 1990 Yorkshire Cup Final during the 1990–91 season at Elland Road, Leeds on Sunday 23 September 1990.

Regal Trophy Final appearances
Martin Ketteridge played right-, scored two tries, and was a man of the match, in Castleford Tigers' 33-2 victory over Wigan in the 1993–94 Regal Trophy Final during the 1993–94 season at Headingley, Leeds on Saturday 22 January 1994.

References

External links
Regal Trophy: Wigan unrest highlighted by Trophy defeat: Headingley witnesses extraordinary turn of events masterminded by Ketteridge
Ketteridge aims to boost medal haul
Martin Ketteridge Memory Box Search at archive.castigersheritage.com

1964 births
Living people
Castleford Tigers players
English people of Scottish descent
English rugby league players
Halifax R.L.F.C. players
Place of birth missing (living people)
Rugby league props
Rugby league second-rows
Scotland national rugby league team players
Sheffield Eagles (1984) players